HobbyKing is a Hong Kong based sales site that mainly distributes products dedicated to model airplanes and remote controlled (RC) models.

History
The company was founded in 2001 in Hong Kong by Karen Wu and Anthony Hand. The company targets the market with low-cost equipment for the models it sells.

HobbyKing, today, contributes to activities of the major players in the world of modeling part from young beginners.

The company opened gradually to local markets through the opening of regional warehouses, today it consists of seven warehouses in Hong Kong, Australia, USA, Netherlands, United Kingdom and China.

On Jun 5, 2018, the Federal Communications Commission proposed a $2.8 million fine for marketing devices that utilized unauthorized radio spectrum.

On July 23, 2020, The FCC issued a forfeiture order to HobbyKing legally requiring them to pay the $2.8 million dollar fine.

References

External links
Official website

Retail companies of Hong Kong
Companies established in 2001
Toy retailers
Online companies of China